The 1927 Ohio Bobcats football team was an American football team that represented Ohio University in the Buckeye Athletic Association (BAA) and the Ohio Athletic Conference (OAC) during the 1927 college football season. In their fourth season under head coach Don Peden, the Bobcats compiled a 4–2–2 record and outscored opponents by a total of 85 to 69.

Schedule

References

Ohio
Ohio
Ohio Bobcats football seasons
Ohio Bobcats football